The Independent Examinations Board, or IEB, is a South African independent assessment agency which offers examinations for various client schools, mostly private schools. It is most prominent in setting examinations for the school-leaving National Senior Certificate, or NSC (which replaced the Senior Certificate and Further Education and Training Certificate) for its client schools. See High school: South Africa; Matriculation in South Africa.

Schools that write IEB exams

Free State

Christian Brothers' College, St Joseph's – Bloemfontein
Harriston School, Harrismith
St. Andrew's, Welkom
St Dominic's College – Welkom
St. Peter Claver High School, Kroonstad
 Curro Bloemfontein

Western Cape
Ambleside School of Hout Bay
Bridge House School, Franschoek
Bishops Diocesan College 
Cedar House School, Kenilworth
Christian Brothers' College, St John's Parklands 
Curro Brackenfell
Curro Century City
Curro Durbanville
Curro Hermanus
Curro Langebaan
Curro Mossel Bay
Curro Krugersdorp
Curro Somerset West
Deutsche Schule Kapstadt 
Elkanah House, Sunningdale
Glenwood House, George
Knysna Montessori School
Oakhill School, Knysna
Reddam House Atlantic Seaboard, Cape Town
Reddam House Constantia
Reddam House Durbanville
Reddam House Somerset West
 Rylands High School
Silvermine Academy, Sun Valley
Somerset College, Somerset West
St. Cyprian's School, Oranjezicht, Cape Town

Eastern Cape
Diocesan School for Girls, Grahamstown
Harvest Christian School, Port Elizabeth
Kingswood College, Grahamstown
Merrifield Preparatory School and College, East London
St Dominic's Priory School, Port Elizabeth
St.Monica's Diocesan School, Matatiele
St Mark Community School, Port Elizabeth
St. Andrew's College, Grahamstown
St. George's College, Port Elizabeth
Vela School, Mthatha
Willow Academy, Port Elizabeth
Woodridge College, Port Elizabeth
BRYLIN ILC, PORT Elizabeth
Theodor Herzl School, Port Elizabeth
GET AHEAD COLLEGE,Queenstown

Gauteng 
 Ashton International College, Benoni
 Assumption Convent School
 Beaulieu College, Kyalami
 BESA Leadership Academy, Walkerville
 Bishop Bavin School, Bedfordview
 Brainline Learning World
 Brescia House
 Christ Church Preparatory School and College
 Christian Brothers' College, Boksburg
 Christian Brothers' College, Pretoria
 Cornwall Hill College, Irene
 Crawford College, Lonehill 
 Crawford College, Pretoria
 Crawford College, Sandton
 Covenant College, Rispark
 Curro Aurora Private School, Randburg
 Curro Hazeldean College
 Curro Roodeplaat
 Dainfern College
 De La Salle Holy Cross College, Victory Park
 Deutsche Internationale Schule Johannesburg
 Deutsche Internationale Schule Pretoria
 Dominican Convent School Belgravia 
 Doxa Deo College
 Eduplex Pre- Primary- and High School
 Hartwell Private School
 Hatfield Christian School, Pretoria
 Pretoria Secondary School
 Helpmekaar Kollege
 Henley High and Preparatory
 HeronBridge College
 Hirsch Lyons
 Holy Rosary School 
 Hyde Park High School
 King David Schools

 King's School, Linbro Park
 King's School, Robinhills
 King's School, West Rand
 Kingsmead College
 La Salle College, West Rand
 Leeuwenhof Akademie, Bedfordview
 Maragon Private School, Mooikloof
 Maragon Private School, Roodepoort
Marantha Christian School, Kempton Park
 Marist Brothers Linmeyer
 Michael Mount Waldorf School, Bryanston
 Midstream College, Midrand
 Pinnacle College Kyalami, Kyalami
 Rand College, Bezuidenhout Valley
 Reddam House College, Bedfordview
 The Kings College and Preparatory School Bryanston
 Redhill School
 Roedean School
 Sacred Heart College, Johannesburg
 Saheti School
 Southdowns College, Irene
 Shangri-la Academy, Kempton Park
 St Barnabas College
 St Benedicts College for Boys
 St David's Marist, Inanda
 St Dominic's Catholic School for Girls
 St Dunstan's College
 St Mary's School, Waverley
 St Peter's College
 St Stithians College
 St. Alban's College
 St. Andrew's School for Girls
 St. Catherine's School
 St. John's College
 St. Mary's Diocesan School for Girls
 St. Teresa's School, Rosebank
 Summerhill International College, Midrand
 The King's College and Preparatory School, Bryanston
 Jacaranda College and primary School, Centurion
 Tyger Valley College, Pretoria
 Veritas College – Springs 
 Woodhill College, Pretoria
 Word of Life Christian School, Vereeniging
 Yeshiva College of South Africa
Curro Waterstone College, Kibler Park

KwaZulu-Natal
Ashton International College, Ballito
Clifton College
Creston College
Deutsche Schule Hermannsburg
Domino Servite School
Durban Girls' College
Epworth High School
Felixton College
Grace College
Grantleigh College
Hibberdene Academy
Hilton College
Holy Family College
Kearsney College
Maris Stella School
Michaelhouse
Our Lady of Fatima Convent School
Reddam House Umhlanga
Richards Bay Christian School
Southcity Christian College
Southcity Christian Schools
St. Anne's Diocesan College
St. Charles College
St. Benedict School, Pinetown
St. Dominics, Newcastle
St. Henry's Marist Brothers' College
St. John's Diocesan School for Girls
St. Mary's Diocesan School for Girls
St. Nicholas Diocesan School, Pietermaritzburg
St. Patrick's College, Kokstad
The Wykeham Collegiate
Thomas More College
Treverton College
Siyahlomula High School

Mpumalanga
Curro Bankenveld, Witbank
Curro Nelspruit
Penryn College
St. Thomas Aquinas School, Witbank
Uplands College
Cambridge Academy, Witbank

North West
Lebone II College of The Royal Bafokeng
Curro Klerksdorp
Selly Park High School
Kitsong Independent High School of The Royal Bafokengg

Northern Cape
St Patrick’s Christian Brothers’ College, Kimberley

Limpopo
Curro Heuwelkruin, Polokwane
Eagles Nest Christian School, Polokwane
Jabez Christian Academy, Polokwane
Khanyisa Education Centre
Maseala Progressive, Polokwane
Mitchell House, Polokwane
Pepps College, Polokwane
Southern Cross Schools, Hoedspruit
Stanford Lake College, Haenertsburg
The King's Court Christian School, Modjadjiskloof
Waterberg Academy, Vaalwater
Mokopane English Combined School, Mokopane
Kingfisher Private School, Phalaborwa

Namibia
Brightstart Montessori School
Privaatskool Moria
Private School Elnatan
Pro-Ed Akademie
Privaatskool Keetmanshoop
The Dolphin Elementary and Secondary School
Tsumeb Gimnasium
Windhoek Afrikaanse Privaatskool

Mozambique 
Trichardt School for Christian Education

References

External links

Education in South Africa
School examinations